Mlabri can refer to:
 Mlabri people
 Mlabri language

Language and nationality disambiguation pages